Opisthotropis durandi, Durand's mountain stream snake, is a species of natricine snake found in Laos.

References

Opisthotropis
Reptiles described in 2014
Reptiles of Laos